Grégory Tafforeau (born 29 September 1976) is a French former professional footballer who played as a defender.

Career
After eight years at Lille OSC, Tafforeau, along with club officials, chose to prematurely terminate his contract. On 4 July 2009, the left-back signed for Stade Malherbe Caen on a free transfer having previously played for Caen from 1998 to 2001.

Honours
Lille
UEFA Intertoto Cup: 2004

References

External links
 

Living people
1976 births
Footballers from Normandy
Sportspeople from Seine-Maritime
Association football defenders
French footballers
FC Rouen players
Lille OSC players
Stade Malherbe Caen players
Ligue 1 players
Ligue 2 players